KMK may refer to
 Kongunadu Munnetra Kazhagam, a political party in the Indian state of Tamil Nadu
 Kottonmouth Kings, an American rap rock band
 Kultusministerkonferenz, a German state conference
 Makabana Airport, in the Republic of the Congo, which has that IATA airport code